Magnus Nilsson may refer to:
 (born 1947), winner of the 1992 Guldbagge Award for Best Screenplay
Magnus Nilsson (athlete) (1888–1958), Swedish Olympic athlete
Magnus the Strong (1106–1134), Scandinavian ruler
Magnus Nilsson (ice hockey) (born 1978), Swedish ice hockey player
Magnus Nilsson (chef) (born 1983), Swedish chef